The 2020 Monza FIA Formula 3 round is a motor racing event held on 5 and 6 September 2020 at the Autodromo Nazionale di Monza in Monza, Italy. It was the penultimate round of the 2020 FIA Formula 3 Championship, and ran in support of the 2020 Italian Grand Prix. 

With Frederik Vesti's win and Oscar Piastri finishing in third in the first race, Prema Racing prematurely secured the teams' championship back-to-back with three races to spare.

Entries 
Sophia Flörsch returned to drive for Campos Racing, with Andreas Estner, her replacement in Spa, returning to the Euroformula Open Championship.

Classification

Qualifying 
The Qualifying session took place on 4 September 2020, with Théo Pourchaire setting the fastest laptime of the session. However, him, Smolyar, Chovet, Zendeli, Caldwell, Fernández, Beckmann, Vesti and championship leader Oscar Piastri were all penalized for blocking the track in Qualifying, therefore allowing Liam Lawson, who had initially set the fourth-best laptime, to inherit pole position.

Notes：

  - Théo Pourchaire, Aleksandr Smolyar, Pierre-Louis Chovet, Lirim Zendeli, Olli Caldwell, Sebastián Fernández and David Beckmann were served five-place grid drops for Race 1 for driving unnecessarily slowly before Turn 11, which forced the following cars to slow down and caused a potentially dangerous situation..
 - Aleksandr Smolyar was given a further three-place grid drop for driving unnecessary slowly before Turn 2, which forced the entire field to slow down and caused a potentially dangerous situation.
- Lirim Zendeli was given an additional five-place grid drop for impeding Liam Lawson at Turn 2.
- Frederik Vesti and Oscar Piastri were given three-place grid drops after it was found that they drove unnecessarily slowly and impeded Jake Hughes.

Race 1 

 Notes：

  - Jack Doohan originally finished twelfth, but was given a five second time penalty after it was found that he overtook Enzo Fittipaldi before the end of a Safety Car period.
 - Matteo Nannini received a three-place grid penalty for race 2 for causing contact between himself and Liam Lawson.

Race 2 

 Notes：

  - Liam Lawson originally finished second, but was given a ten-second time penalty for forcing Lirim Zendeli off the track at turn 1.
  - Bent Viscaal originally finished eleventh, but was disqualified for a team member reattaching his steering wheel to the car without requesting permission from the Technical Delegate.

Standings after the event 

Drivers' Championship standings

Teams' Championship standings

 Note: Only the top five positions are included for both sets of standings.

See also 

 2020 Italian Grand Prix
 2020 Monza Formula 2 round

Notes

References

External links 
Official website

|- style="text-align:center"
|width="35%"|Previous race:
|width="30%"|FIA Formula 3 Championship2020 season
|width="40%"|Next race:

Autodromo Internazionale di Monza
Formula 3 Monza